Quadriptilia philorectis is a moth of the family Pterophoridae. It is known from Peru.

The wingspan is 39–41 mm. Adults are on wing in September.

External links

Pterophorinae
Moths described in 1926
Taxa named by Edward Meyrick
Moths of South America